Kui Mulang is a deity in traditional Chinese spiritual beliefs. He is considered to be one of the 28 Mansions, which are Chinese constellations. These constellations are the same as those studied in Western astrology. Kui Mulang originated from the ancient Chinese worship of the constellations, a spiritual practice that combines Chinese mythology and astronomy. 

Kui Mulang appears in Chinese mythology and literature, notably in the novels Journey to the West and Fengshen Yanyi. He is linked to a historical figure called Ma Wu, a general who hailed from the town of Huyang in Tanghe, located in the Henan province.

Star location

Kui Mulang is associated with the constellation Andromeda, which appears in the sky in the middle of November. Andromeda has a spiral nebula, which is a small universe about 2.5 million light-years away from Earth. In this constellation is Kui Xiu, described as the "four-legged fish palace" of Heshansu (和善宿) because its shape is similar to a fish. Indian mythology also references this constellation, also calling it a "fish palace." 

Another constellation, the White Tiger, is also associated with this cluster of stars.

Legends

Fengshen Yanyi
According to the novel Investiture of the Gods (Fengshen Yanyi), Kui Mulang was originally named Li Xiong. After he died in the Battle of the Ten Thousand Immortals, Jiang Ziya deified him as the Wood Wolf of Legs, one of the twenty-eight stars.

Journey to the West
In the classic Chinese novel Journey to the West, Kui Mulang appears as a demon named Yellow Robe Demon (黃袍怪). He lives the Moon Waves Cave (波月洞) on Bowl Mountain (碗子山) in the Kingdom of Baoxiang (寶象國). In his past, the Yellow Robe Demon falls in love with the Jade Maiden (玉女) in Heaven and decides to elope with her. He becomes a demon lord and the maiden is reincarnated from a goddess to a human who is named Baihuaxiu (百花羞). She is the third princess of the Kingdom of Baoxiang. The demon then kidnaps the princess, though she has no memory of her existence as a Jade Maiden. He marries her and the couple has two children.

The Yellow Robe Demon then learns that the Buddhist monk Tang Sanzang has arrived at his mountain. According to tradition, the Yellow Robed Demon knows that eating a monk's flesh will grant him immortality. Thus, he captures Tang Sanzang. Learning of their master's capture, two of the monk's disciples, Zhu Bajie and Sha Wujing, endeavor to save their master. However, in battle, they are no match for the demon. 

Zhu Bajie goes to Sun Wukong and asks for help battling the Yellow Robed Demon. Sun Wukong had previously been banished by Tang Sanzang, at Zhu Bajie goading, for killing the White Bone Demon. Sun Wukong manages to defeat the demon, which mysteriously vanishes after his defeat. Wukong then seeks help from Heaven to track down the demon and learn his true identity. The Jade Emperor discovers that one of the 28 Mansions is missing, so he orders the remaining 27 to subdue the demon. The demon is revealed to be a disguised as Revatī, the Wood Wolf of Legs (奎木狼), a star deity in the heavenly court, and one of the 28 Mansions. The Wood Wolf is then subdued and brought back to Heaven. As punishment, he is ordered to become a furnace keeper under Taishang Laojun.>

References 

Chinese gods
Journey to the West characters
Shapeshifting
Stellar gods